The Koll Guitar Company is an American guitar manufacturing company based in Portland, Oregon. The company, established in 1986 by Saul Koll, produces electric and semi-acoustic guitars. 

The company is known for its "Glide" series (which has had improvements such as the "Superior"), and for its experimental designs for musicians such as David Torn, Elliott Sharp, Henry Kaiser and Lee Ranaldo of Sonic Youth.Other models by Koll are the Troubadour and the Super Cub, designed in the 1950s style.

History 
Koll began playing guitar at the age of 12, and discovered Irving Sloan's book, Classic Guitar Construction, at a Southern California library. While attending college at San Diego State University, where he earned a bachelor of arts in sculpture, Koll began experimenting with guitar construction. After college he began his professional luthier career at instrument repair shop The World of Strings in Long Beach, California, where was tutored by Jon Peterson and Glen Mers.

In 1986, Koll founded the "Koll Guitar Company" and subsequently relocated from Los Angeles to Portland, Oregon, where the company is currently based. Since 2015, most of all of Koll's guitars have been hand-built in-house by Saul Koll himself.

Further reading 
 Bench Press: Saul Koll Interview with Saul Koll in the publication Fretboard Journal (2013)
 Koll Company News Forum post by Saul Koll on The Gear Page (2015)

References

External links 
 Official website

Guitar manufacturing companies of the United States
manufacturing companies based in Portland, Oregon
American companies established in 1986
1986 establishments in Oregon